The Bahamas requires its residents to register their motor vehicles and display a vehicle registration plate. Current plates are North American standard 6 × 12 inches (152 × 300 mm). The configuration of the plates is two letters followed by four numbers. At the bottom of the plate it's shown the flag of the Bahamas.  

The text of the plates vary by island, with each island or group issuing their own plates.

References

Bahamas
Transport in the Bahamas
Bahamas transport-related lists